Maria  Yevgenyevna Kryuchkova (7 July 1988 –  8 March 2015) was a Russian gymnast. She won a bronze medal in the team event at the  2004 Summer Olympics.

Career
Kryuchkova competed at the 2002 Junior European Championships in Patras, Greece, winning team gold and placing sixth on floor. In 2003, she won team bronze at the WOGA Classic in Texas, USA. Later that year, she swept the Friendship Classic. In 2004, she did not make the Russian team for the European Championships, but won gold on floor, and placed fifth in the all-around and eighth on vault at the Russian Cup. She was named to the Russian team for the Olympic Games in Athens, where she contributed to a team bronze medal.

Death

Kryuchkova died of an embolism on 8 March 2015, at age 26.

Competitive history

See also 

 List of Olympic female gymnasts for Russia

References 

1988 births
2015 deaths
Sportspeople from Rostov-on-Don
Russian female artistic gymnasts
Olympic gymnasts of Russia
Gymnasts at the 2004 Summer Olympics
Olympic bronze medalists for Russia
Olympic medalists in gymnastics
Deaths from embolism
Medalists at the 2004 Summer Olympics